Franck Kom (born 18 September 1991) is a Cameroonian professional footballer who plays as a midfielder.

References

External links
 
 

1991 births
Living people
Footballers from Douala
Association football midfielders
Cameroonian footballers
Karlsruher SC players
Étoile Sportive du Sahel players
Espérance Sportive de Tunis players
Al-Rayyan SC players
Zakho FC players
Al-Ahli Saudi FC players
2. Bundesliga players
Qatar Stars League players
Iraqi Premier League players
Saudi Professional League players
Saudi First Division League players
Cameroon international footballers
Cameroon under-20 international footballers
2015 Africa Cup of Nations players
Cameroonian expatriate footballers
Expatriate footballers in Tunisia
Expatriate footballers in Germany
Expatriate footballers in Qatar
Expatriate footballers in Iraq
Expatriate footballers in Saudi Arabia
Cameroonian expatriate sportspeople in Tunisia
Cameroonian expatriate sportspeople in Germany
Cameroonian expatriate sportspeople in Qatar
Cameroonian expatriate sportspeople in Iraq
Cameroonian expatriate sportspeople in Saudi Arabia
African Games bronze medalists for Cameroon
African Games medalists in football
Panthère du Ndé players
Competitors at the 2011 All-Africa Games
Cameroon A' international footballers
2011 African Nations Championship players